Pseudohyparpalus is a genus of beetles in the family Carabidae, containing the following species:

 Pseudohyparpalus angustipennis (Putzeys In Chaudoir, 1876) 
 Pseudohyparpalus audens (Peringuey, 1899) 
 Pseudohyparpalus basilewskyi Lecordier, 1978 
 Pseudohyparpalus bulirschi Facchini, 2004 
 Pseudohyparpalus burgeoni Basilewsky, 1949 
 Pseudohyparpalus casperi (Kuntzen, 1919) 
 Pseudohyparpalus diastictus (Alluaud, 1926) 
 Pseudohyparpalus elegans Clarke, 1981 
 Pseudohyparpalus elongatus (Jeannel, 1948) 
 Pseudohyparpalus fimbriatus Clarke, 1981 
 Pseudohyparpalus hova (Alluaud, 1918) 
 Pseudohyparpalus kolbei (Kuntzen, 1919) 
 Pseudohyparpalus luluensis (Burgeon, 1936) 
 Pseudohyparpalus metabolus (Alluaud, 1926) 
 Pseudohyparpalus mossoensis Basilewsky, 1956 
 Pseudohyparpalus nindae (Burgeon, 1937)  
 Pseudohyparpalus nyassicus Clarke, 1981 
 Pseudohyparpalus puncticollis (Boheman, 1848) 
 Pseudohyparpalus quadratus Clarke, 1981 
 Pseudohyparpalus rectangularis Clarke, 1981

References

Harpalinae